MPIC may refer to:
 Manitoba Public Insurance
 Metro Pacific Investments Corporation
 IBM MultiProcessor Interrupt Controller